KOE (Krewe of Elvis) is a Mardi Gras organization in New Orleans.

KOE or Koe may also refer to:

 Koe, a surname and given name, including a list of people with the name
 Communist Organization of Greece (Κομμουνιστική Οργάνωση Ελλάδας, Kommounistikí Orgánosi Elládas, KOE), a Greek political party
 El Tari International Airport, Indonesia, IATA airport code KOE
 Baale language, ISO 939-3 language code koe

See also 

 Coe (disambiguation)
 Khoe (disambiguation)
 Koe o Kikasete (disambiguation)
 King of Europe Cup (KOE Cup), a European professional wrestling tournament
 Koe de Oshigoto!, or KoeGoto, a 2008–2013 manga series
 Koe Girl! or Koe Gāru!, a Japanese TV series
 Koe no Katachi, a Japanese manga series 
 Acho Dene Koe First Nation, a Dene band government based in Fort Liard, Northwest Territories, Canada
 "Sora/Koe" ('Air/Voice'), a song by Every Little Thing
 Koei, a Japanese video game publisher 
 Kōei, a Japanese era name 
 Koës, a village in the ǁKaras Region of south-eastern Namibia